Vecsey is a surname. Notable people with the surname include:

August von Vécsey (1775–1857) Austrian general of the Napoleonic Wars, father of Károly, relative of Peter
Franz von Vecsey (1893–1935), Hungarian violinist and composer
George Vecsey (born 1939), American writer
Károly Vécsey (1803–1849), Hungarian Army general
Peter Vecsey (sports columnist) (born 1943), American sports columnist and analyst
Peter von Vécsey (1768–1809) Austrian general of the Napoleonic Wars killed at the Battle of Wagram, relative of August